Chaetostoma lineopunctatum is a species of catfish in the family Loricariidae. It is native to South America, where it occurs in the basins of the Aguaytía River, the Pachitea River, and the Pisqui River in the Ucayali River drainage in Peru. The species reaches 14.3 cm (5.6 inches) SL. It appears in the aquarium trade, where it is referred to as the bloodfin bulldog pleco or by its L-number, which is L-276.

References 

lineopunctatum
Fish described in 1942